Willis Allen Trafton Jr. (November 13, 1918 – April 3, 1994) was an American politician and lawyer from Maine. A Republican from Auburn, Maine, Trafton served in the Maine House of Representatives and was its Speaker from 1955 to 1956. He was a lawyer, with degrees from Yale University and Harvard University (1947). He also was the Republican nominee for Governor of Maine in the 1956 Maine gubernatorial election.

References

1918 births
1994 deaths
Yale University alumni
Harvard Law School alumni
Politicians from Auburn, Maine
Speakers of the Maine House of Representatives
Republican Party members of the Maine House of Representatives
Maine lawyers
20th-century American politicians
20th-century American lawyers